Dragon Fire may refer to:
 In fiction and mythology, the ability of dragons to exhale fire, or any of several things which allude to this power
 Dragon Fire (roller coaster), a roller coaster at Canada's Wonderland
 Dragon Fire (novel), a 2000 political novel by journalist Humphrey Hawksley about a future war between China, Pakistan, and India
 Dragon Fire (mortar), a heavy automated mortar under testing by the United States Marine Corps
 Dragon Fire (film), a 1993 martial arts film starring several kickboxing champions
 Quest for Glory V: Dragon Fire, the final game in the Quest for Glory series by Sierra

Dragonfire may refer to:
 Dragonfire (Doctor Who), a 1987 serial in the science fiction television series Doctor Who
 Dragonfire (video game), a 1982 video game released by Imagic
 Dragonfire (novel) an Andrew Kaplan spy thriller about a CIA agent trying to prevent another Southeast war
 Alternate title of Tagget, a 1991 spy film/thriller
 Dragonfire II: The Dungeonmaster's Assistant, a 1985 computer program for managing tabletop role-playing games
 Dragonfire (weapon), a British directed-energy weapon technology demonstrator

See also
Dragon's Fire, a novel in the Dragonriders of Pern series.